SATMODE is a set of technologies originally developed for interactive TV and based on an always-on return channel via satellite designed for ultra low-cost feasibility. 

Although no SATMODE network has been deployed up to now for interactive TV, the SATMODE technology is used in the ASTRA2Connect two-way satellite broadband Internet service available across Europe.

Purpose of the technology

SATMODE is an interactive TV solution via satellite, targeting the mass-market through consumer products.

SATMODE supports services to the viewer, like the following ones:
 Interactive advertising
 Betting
 Communication: Chat, SMS, e-mail
 Tele-Voting, Polls, Play-along, Quiz
 Games: standalone or multiplayer
 Home Shopping
 Personal Data Consultation / banking
 Walled Garden Internet Services

SATMODE also supports features allowing the technical management of the iTV platform:
 Enhanced conditional access
 Audience metering
 Statistics gathering
 Hard disk drive content management

The system is scalable up to the complete DTH population and is designed to minimize the terminal cost.

Modem Layer

The modem layer is specified by a CENELEC standard (EN50478).

The system flexibility allows SATMODE to be used in extreme scenarios by adjusting the modem parameters:
 Very power limited scenarios (it’s the case for most VSAT Ku-band satellites)
 Aggressive multi-beam satellite space segment allowing to increase the return channel speed for a given translit power

To reach the flexibility goal and nevertheless keep full interoperatibility of terminals, SATMODE uses a fully specified waveform toolbox. 

The choice of constant envelope modulations is made to minimize the terminal cost. Thanks to this property, very low cost outdoor units (ODUs) operating at full saturation and in non-linear mode can be used.

Moderate bit rates allow to use very low power transmitters (typically 100 mW), keeping the cost compatible with the mass-market.

The selected access scheme -- slotted ALOHA -- is efficient on iTV traffic and very easy to scale up to a very high number of terminals only sending a few packets from time to time.

The building blocks of the SATMODE toolbox are:
 Binary or quaternary CPM
 Programmable phase filter for CPM modulations (GMSK being a specific case)
 Flexible Turbo or Turbo-like 
 Programmable interleavers (3)
 Programmable constituent codes with bypass possibilities (2)
 Programmable Unique Word structure
 Tables extraction from a DVB TS (DVB-S or DVB-S2 broadcast)

All the parameters are sent by the HUB through DVB tables, even allowing changes during operation:
 FCT: Sprectrum organisation in Carrier Groups
 FAT: Spectrum Allocation to services

Signalisation information sent to specific terminals is also embedded in DVB tables (SMT tables).

The terminal is fully defined: it must be able to play the complete waveform space.
The HUB is in the ground station. The HUB usually only implements one scheme and sends the tables to the terminals to instruct them to play that scheme.

SATMODE Project

The SATMODE development project has been funded at 50% by ESA.

References
 ESA  Retrieved Aug. 28, 2005
 SES-ASTRA  Retrieved Aug. 28, 2005
 Newtec

External links
ASTRA2Connect website

Satellite television